Ammonium iodate is an inorganic salt which is sparingly soluble in cold, and moderately soluble in hot water, like all iodate salts, it is a strong oxidizer.

Preparation
Ammonium iodate can be obtained by neutralising a solution of iodic acid with ammonia.

Using its low solubility in water, it can also be precipitated from an iodate solution with an ammonium salt.

Unlike other iodates, ammonium iodate can't be prepared by dissolving iodine in an ammonium hydroxide solution, instead the highly explosive nitrogen triiodide is formed.

Chemical properties
Because ammonium iodate consists of the reducing ammonium ion and the oxidizing iodate ion, it already starts to decompose at 150 °C into nitrogen, oxygen, iodine and water.

Below 60 °C this reaction cannot sustain itself, but with catalysts like potassium dichromate or copper(II) chloride it can also combust at room temperature.

Safety
Like all iodates, ammonium iodate is a strong oxidizer and should therefore be kept away from flammable materials like sulfur, phosphorus and metals powders

References

Iodates
Ammonium compounds